Fernley Hope Banbury (22 December 1881 – 26 May 1963) was an English scientist and engineer. He invented the Banbury mixer, which is used to mix or blend a wide range of materials used in different industries including the food, chemical, pharmaceutical, plastic, rubber and mineral industries.

Biography
He was born in England on 22 December 1881 in Cornwall, England. In 1904, he migrated to the United States, and earned a B.S. in electrical engineering from Purdue University in 1906, with a thesis titled "Test of New Lighting Plant". His yearbook records this about him: "if genuine English perseverance coupled with absolute honesty can achieve success, Fernly has a bright future." He received the Charles Goodyear Medal in 1959, one of only two electrical engineers ever to do so (the other being Adolf Schallamach). He was an executive at the Farrel Corporation of Ansonia, Connecticut. He died on 26 May 1963 in Torquay, England.

References

1881 births
1963 deaths
Polymer scientists and engineers
Purdue University College of Engineering alumni
Tire industry people